Benjamin Schandy (born 18 August 1998), better known by his stage name Jimi Somewhere, is a Norwegian singer-songwriter, music producer and designer. His musical genres are alternative, indie and electronic pop.

Career

2016-2018: Early career and debut EP Memoria
In 2016 Jimi was named "Ukas Urørt" by Norwegian radio station NRK P3. The following year, he released his debut EP Memoria, through his record label Inquiring Minds. The EP was precedeed by two singles "Escape" and "The Beach".

In the same year, American magazine The Fader posted a list of 15 Scandinavian artists to listen to in 2018, with Jimi as number nine. Jimi also performed at festivals such as Ekkofestival and by:Larm. In 2018 he joined Norwegian indie band Boy Pablo on their European tour.

2019: Second EP Ponyboy
In 2019, he released his second EP Ponyboy on 5 April, in which it was produced and recorded in Los Angeles. The EP was preceded by two singles "1st Place" and "I Shot My Dog". The former was released on 8 February 2019, while the latter was released on 8 March.

2020-present: Debut album Nothing Gold Can Stay
On 14 May 2020, Jimi announced the title of his debut album Nothing Gold Can Stay, which was originally planned to be released in 2020. The album's lead single "Bottle Rocket" was released on 31 July 2020. The second single "Jesus" was released on 11 September 2020. The song features guest vocals from American singer-songwriter Kacy Hill. On 13 November 2020, "In My Car" was released as the third single. The album's fourth single "Wedding" was released on 11 December 2020. The fifth and final single "The World" was released on 22 January 2021. The album was finally released on 5 February 2021.

Discography

Studio albums

Extended plays

Singles

As lead artist

As featured artist

Promotional singles

Guest appearances

References

External links 
 

1998 births
21st-century Norwegian male singers
English-language singers from Norway
Living people
Norwegian songwriters